Salem Township is an inactive township in Lewis County, in the U.S. state of Missouri.

Salem Township was established in 1841, taking its name from a local church of the same name.

References

Townships in Missouri
Townships in Lewis County, Missouri